The Moselle Wine Queen, until 2006 the Moselle-Saar-Ruwer Wine Queen (Mosel-Saar-Ruwer-Weinkönigin), is a young woman who is elected for a period of a year to represent the Moselle wine region. The first one was chosen in 1949. In the year following her 'reign', the Moselle Wine Queen is eligible to run for the position of German Wine Queen.

List of Moselle wine queens 
The wine queens of Moselle-Saar-Ruwer:

 1949/1950: Marie-Elisabeth Steffen née Pütz, Saarburg, German Wine Queen in 1950/1951
 1950/1951: Waltraud Jarrold née Krall, Winningen
 1951/1952: Bernarda Rath née von Nell, Trier
 1952/1953: Gertrud Weimer née Görgen, Zell
 1953/1954: Juliane König née Kohl, Dhron
 1954/1955: Appollonia Clüsserath née Schmitz, Trittenheim
 1955/1956: Ursel Sünner née Schwarzbeck, Winningen
 1956/1957: Helga Steuer née Fuchs, Pommern (Mosel)
 (not regional wine queen) Margret Wilmes née Hoffranzen, Mehring, German Wine Queen in 1956/1957
 1957/1958: Helga Alsbach née Simonis, Kobern-Gondorf
 1958/1959: Gertrude Riepe, Traben-Trarbach
 1959/1961: Doris Knebel née Löwenstein, Winningen
 1961/1963: Irmine Hoffmann née Regnery, Klüsserath
 1963/1964: Inge Heidenreich née Schwaab, Zeltingen, German Wine Queen in 1963/1964
 1964/1965: Siegrun Weber-Herges, Kröv
 1965/1966: Hildegard Kochendörfer née Bidinger, Saarburg
 1966/1967: Birgit Höreth née Schaaf, Winningen
 1966/1967: Ruth Kutz née Collet, Reil, German Wine Queen in 1967/1968
 1967/1968: Hildegard Ziegenhagen née Ketter, Kröv
 1968/1969: Elisabeth Weis née Steffes, Leiwen
 1969/1970: Monika McKinstry née Servaty, Mesenich
 1970/1971: Reinhilde Lima née Rothbrust, Kasel
 1971/1972: Marlene Weber née Mai, Mehring
 1972/1973: Hildrud Specht née Zenzen, Ellenz-Poltersdorf
 1973/1974: Anneliese Zilliken née Hellers, Nittel
 1974/1975: Cornelia Kröber née Löwenstein, Winningen
 1975/1976: Jutta Montag née Kieren, Graach
 1975/1976: Rita Hermes, Ellenz-Poltersdorf
 1976/1977: Juliane Weiler née Loskill, Mehring
 1977/1978: Angela Schmidt née Hahn, Koblenz-Güls
 1978/1979: Rita Moog-Fischer, Valwig, German Wine Queen in 1979/1980
 1979/1980: Giesela Kiefer, Wiltingen
 1980/1981: Susanne Mölich née Körber, Winningen
 1981/1982: Ingrid Scholtes née Welter, Klüsserath
 1982/1983: Angelika Clüsserath, Trittenheim
 1983/1984: Christine Lucas née Weis, Leiwen
 1984/1985: Mechthild Weis née Meyer, Waldrach, German Wine Queen in 1985/1986
 1985/1986: Jutta Schneider née Simon, Ayl
 1986/1987: Jutta Fassian-Emmrich, Mehring, previously wine queen of Mehring, German Wine Queen in 1987/1988
 1987/1988: Sigrid Braun, Ernst
 1988/1989: Stephanie Balthasar née Michels, Klotten
 1989/1990: Annette Kröger, Neef
 1990/1991: Lydia Bollig-Strohm, Trittenheim, German Wine Queen in 1991/1992
 1991/1992: Bettina Fischer, Briedel
 1992/1993: Rita Marmann née Schneider, Schweich
 1993/1994: Judith Bell née Schwarz, Müden
 1994/1995: Sabine Zenz, Ediger-Eller
 1995/1996: Gaby Hoffmann, Osann-Monzel
 1996/1997: Sandra Berweiler, Leiwen
 1997/1998: Tina Hergenröder, Oberfell
 1998/1999: Marion Erbes, Wolf (Traben-Trarbach)
 1999/2000: Carina Dostert, Nittel, German Wine Queen in 2000/2001
 2000/2001: Anne Oberbillig, Trier
 2001/2002: Janine Rosinski, St. Aldegund
 2002/2003: Kristina Simon, Schweich
 2003/2004: Petra Zimmermann, Temmels, German Wine Queen in 2004/2005
 2004/2005: Nicole Kochan, Lieser
 2005/2006: Anne Mertes, Konz-Oberemmel
 2006/2007: Katja Fehres, Brauneberg, previously wine queen of Brauneberg
 2007/2008: Martina Servaty, Mesenich
 2008/2009: Sonja Christ, Oberfell, German Wine Queen in 2009/2010
 2009/2010: Katharina Okfen, Maring-Noviand
 2010/2011: Ramona Sturm, Moselkern
 2011/2012: Andrea Schlechter, Enkirch
 2012/2013: Maria Steffes, Ayl
 2013/2014: Kathrin Schnitzius, Kröv (66th German Wine Princess in 2014/2015)
 2014/2015: Lisa Dieterichs, Ellenz-Poltersdorf
 2015/2016: Lena Endesfelder, Mehring
 2016/2017: Lisa Schmitt, Leiwen

Saar-Upper Moselle wine queens and princesses 
Since the wine region of Moselle-Saar-Ruwer was renamed in 2006 to the Moselle (Mosel) Wine Region and the title of the wine queen was changed to conform with that, there has been an additional election for the wine queen of the Saar-Upper Moselle Region (Saar-Obermosel-Region).

 2005/2006 Sabrina Schons, Ayl
 Princess(es): Angela Thurn (Konz-Roscheid) and Claudia Maximini
 2006/2007 Angela Thurn, Konz-Roscheid
 Princess(es): N. N.
 2007/2008 Jessica Willems, Nittel
 Princess(es): Christina Rommelfanger and Tamara Beck (Nittel)
 2008/2009 Judith  Schmitt, Oberemmel
  Princess(es): Anne Simon (Ockfen), Michaela Zimmer and Kerstin Michels (Ockfen)
 2009/2010 Anne Simon, Ockfen
 Princess(es): Kerstin Michels (Ockfen) and Natalie Scheer (Kastel-Staadt)
 2010/2011 Anne Thein, Wasserliesch
 Princess(es): Natalie Scheer (Kastel-Staadt) and Melanie Scheuer (Nittel-Rehlingen)
 2011/2012 Maria Steffes, Ayl
 Princess(es):  Elisabeth Ley (Tawern-Fellerich)
 2012/2013 Elisabeth Ley, Tawern-Fellerich
 Princess(es): Frederike Welter (Wincheringen)
2013/2014 Frederike Welter (Wincheringen)
Princess(es): Sitta Piedmont (Konz-Filzen) and Barbara Steffes (Ayl)
2014/2015 Sophie Meyer (Saarburg-Beurig)
Princess(es): Sarah Schmitt (Konz-Filzen)
2015/2016 Sarah Schmitt (Konz-Filzen)
Princess(es): Anna Karges (Schoden) and Kerstin Reinert (Serrig)

External links 
 Moselle Wine Queen
 Names and portraits of the Moselle wine queens since 1949
 Names and portraits of the wine queens and princesses of the Saar-Upper Moselle Region

!
Moselle